The Eternal Road may refer to:

 The Eternal Road (opera), opera by Kurt Weill
 The Eternal Road, novel by Antti Tuuri
 The Eternal Road (film), 2017 Finnish drama film based on the novel